was a Japanese football player. He played for Japan national team.

Club career
Kimura was born in Hiroshima on July 8, 1931. He played for Kwangaku Club was consisted of his alma mater Kwansei Gakuin University players and graduates. He also played for Chudai Club was consisted of Chuo University players and graduates. He won 1950, 1953 and 1955 Emperor's Cup as a member of All Kwangaku and 1957 Emperor's Cup at Chudai Club.

National team career
In March 1954, Kimura was selected Japan national team for 1954 World Cup qualification. At this qualification, on March 7, he debuted against South Korea. He also played at 1954 Asian Games. He played 6 games and scored 1 goal for Japan until 1955.

On February 21, 2007, Kimura died in Ebina at the age of 75.

National team statistics

References

External links
 
 Japan National Football Team Database

1931 births
2007 deaths
Kwansei Gakuin University alumni
Association football people from Hiroshima Prefecture
Japanese footballers
Japan international footballers
Footballers at the 1954 Asian Games
Association football forwards
Hibakusha
Asian Games competitors for Japan